Kornel Makuszyński (8 January 1884 – 31 July 1953) was a Polish writer of children's and youth literature. He was an elected member of the prestigious Polish Academy of Literature in the interwar Poland.

Life
Makuszyński was born in Stryj in the Austrian Partition of Poland (now in Ukraine) to Edward and Julia née Ogonowska. He attended the Jan Długosz gymnasium in Lviv (Polish: Lwów). While in school he wrote occasional poetry (he started writing at the age of 14). Makuszyński had his first poem published in 1902 in the newspaper Słowo Polskie (Polish Word), for which he soon became a theatrical critic. He studied language and literature at both the University of Lviv (then Jan Kazimierz University in Lwów, Poland) and in Paris. He was evacuated to Kiev in 1915, where he ran the Polish Theatre and was the chairman of the Polish writers and journalist community. He moved to Warsaw in 1918, and became a writer.

His children's books, particularly the series about the goat, Koziołek Matołek, illustrated by Marian Walentynowicz, have an enduring popularity in Poland, whatever the sharp changes in the country's fortunes and its political system. They have been translated into many other languages. Among others, they are very popular in Israel, where Polish Jewish immigrants since the 1920s and 1930s took care to have many of them translated into Hebrew and introduced them to their own children.

Makuszyński was temporarily blacklisted right after World War II by his chief rival at the Polish Academy of Literature and later, communist apparatchik Wincenty Rzymowski, a plagiarist. Makuszyński died in 1953 in Zakopane, where he lived from 1945. He was buried at the Peksowe Brzysko cemetery in Zakopane. There is a museum dedicated to him in the city, originally launched by his widow, Janina.

Works
 Arabian Affairs (1913; Awantury Arabskie)
 Innocent Years (1925; Bezgrzeszne lata)
 The Two Who Stole the Moon (1928; O dwóch takich, co ukradli księżyc; filmed in 1962 starring Lech Kaczyński, former President of Poland, and his identical twin brother Jarosław, former Prime Minister of Poland)
 120 adventures of Matołek the Billy-Goat (1933; 120 Przygód Koziołka Matołka)
 The Smile of Lwów, (1934; Usmiech Lwowa)
 Argument about Basia (1936; Awantura o Basię; filmed 1959)
 Satan from the 7th grade (1937; Szatan z siódmej klasy)
 Merry Devil's Friend (1937; Przyjaciel wesołego diabła; filmed 1987)
 About the Wawel Dragon (1937; O wawelskim smoku; filmed 1987)
 Eva's folly (1940; Szaleństwa panny Ewy; filmed 1985)

See also
List of Poles

References

External links 
 Kornel Makuszyński at Culture.pl

1884 births
1953 deaths
People from Stryi
University of Lviv alumni
Members of the Polish Academy of Literature
Golden Laurel of the Polish Academy of Literature
Polish male writers
Occasional poets
Polish children's writers